Naficy is a surname. Notable people with the surname include:

 Aboutorab Naficy (1914–2007), Iranian physician and heart specialist
 Hamid Naficy (born 1944), American scholar 
 Mariam Naficy, American entrepreneur